Shortwave radiation (SW) is radiant energy with wavelengths in the visible (VIS), near-ultraviolet (UV), and near-infrared (NIR) spectra.

There is no standard cut-off for the near-infrared range; therefore, the shortwave radiation range is also variously defined. It may be broadly defined to include all radiation with a wavelength of 0.1μm and 5.0μm or narrowly defined so as to include only radiation between 0.2μm and 3.0μm.

There is little radiation flux (in terms of W/m2) to the Earth's surface below 0.2μm or above 3.0μm, although photon flux remains significant as far as 6.0μm, compared to shorter wavelength fluxes.  UV-C radiation spans from 0.1μm to .28μm, UV-B from 0.28μm to 0.315μm, UV-A from 0.315μm to 0.4μm, the visible spectrum from 0.4μm to 0.7μm, and NIR arguably from 0.7μm to 5.0μm, beyond which the infrared is thermal.

Shortwave radiation is distinguished from longwave radiation. Downward shortwave radiation is sensitive to solar zenith angle, cloud cover.

See also 
 Solar irradiance
 Outgoing longwave radiation

External links
 National Science Digital Library - Shortwave radiation
 Measuring Solar Radiation: The Solar Infrared Radiation Station (SIRS). A lesson plan that deals with shortwave radiation from the SIRS instrument.

Notes

References
Zhang, Y., W. B. Rossow, A. A. Lacis, V. Oinas and M. I. Mischenko (2004). "Calculation of radiative fluxes from the surface to the top of atmosphere based on ISCCP and other global data sets:  Refinements of the radiative transfer model and the input data." Journal of Geophysical Research-Atmospheres 109(D19105).
L. Chen, G. Yan, T. Wang, H. Ren, J. Calbó, J. Zhao, R. McKenzie (2012), Estimation of surface shortwave radiation components under all sky conditions: Modeling and sensitivity analysis, Remote Sensing of Environment, 123: 457–469.

 Waves